The 2006 Perth V8 400 was a motor race for V8 Supercars held on the weekend of 12–14 May 2006. The event was held at Barbagallo Raceway in Perth, Western Australia, and consisted of three races culminating in 400 kilometres. It was the third round of thirteen in the 2006 V8 Supercar Championship Series.

Background
Britek Motorsports' second car returned to the track after José Fernández' heavy accident in the Adelaide 500, this time with local Sports Sedan driver Tony Ricciardello behind the wheel. The entry's Pukekohe replacement, Mark Porter and his MSport team, returned to the Fujitsu Series.

The only other change occurred at Paul Morris Motorsport; Alan Gurr was back in the teams' Holden Commodore VZ having been replaced by New Zealander Fabian Coulthard at the preceding round across the Tasman.

Results

Qualifying

Top Ten Shootout

Race 1

Race 2

Race 3

Round standings

Championship standings

References

Perth V8 400
Perth V8 400
Sport in Perth, Western Australia
Motorsport in Western Australia